Ulla Wolff-Frankfurter (2 April 1850, in Gleiwitz – 1 January 1924, in Berlin), also known by the pen names Ulla Frank and Ulrich Frank, was a German Jewish playwright, novelist, and journalist.

Biography
Ulla Hirschfeld was born in Gleiwitz, Silesia into a scholarly Jewish family. Her father, Hirsch (Max) Hirschfeld, was a rabbi and philosopher of religion, while her maternal grandfather, Solomon Eger, served as Chief Rabbi of Posen. She received her education at home, and later in Breslau and Vienna.

In 1869, she married Rabbi Dr. Lazar Frankfurter, a professor of Italian language and literature, with whom she bore three children, including . She took up residence in Berlin soon after her husband's death in 1878, and married Jewish industrialist Louis Wolff in 1880. She would have two more children from her second marriage.

She died on 1 January 1924 at the age of 74.

Work
This was followed in 1878 by Der Herr College. She thereupon gave up writing for the stage, and devoted her literary activity to stories and novels. Her publications often explored the tension between tradition and modernity in the Jewish family, and the isolated experiencess of ghetto and shtetl life.

As a journalist, she headed the Berlin feature section of the Hamburgischer Correpondent newspaper for over 15 years, and wrote for other newspapers and magazines, especially for the Berliner Tageblatt, the Jahrbuch für jüdische Geschichte und Literatur, the Allgemeine Zeitung des Judentums and the Breslauer Zeitung. She was also the Berlin correspondent of the New Yorker Staats-Zeitung.

Partial bibliography

 
 
 
 
 
 
 
 
 
 
 
 
 
 
 
 
 
 
 
 
 
 *

References
 

1850 births
1924 deaths
19th-century German women writers
20th-century German women writers
German women dramatists and playwrights
German women journalists
German women short story writers
Jewish dramatists and playwrights
Jewish German writers
Jewish journalists
Jewish novelists
Jewish women writers
People from Gliwice
Pseudonymous women writers
Silesian Jews
19th-century pseudonymous writers
20th-century pseudonymous writers